And Then There Were None (released in the US as Ten Little Indians) is a 1974 mystery film and an adaptation of Agatha Christie's best-selling 1939 mystery novel of the same name. The film was directed by Peter Collinson and produced by Harry Alan Towers. This was the second of three versions of Christie's novel to be adapted to the screen by producer Harry Alan Towers. Two film adaptations were previously released (a 1945 version by René Clair and the 1965 adaptation Ten Little Indians). An American made-for-television version was broadcast in 1959. Towers produced a third version in 1989.

Plot
A group of ten people, strangers to one another, arrive at a hotel deep in the Iranian desert, located adjacent to the ruins of Persepolis, 200 miles from civilization. The guests quickly discover that their host is mysteriously absent. At dinner, they notice a display of figurines: the Ten Little Indians, as represented in the doggerel in each of their suites. They are accused via a tape recording by the host, U.N. Owen ("unknown"), someone none of them has ever met, of having escaped justice for committing murders or causing the deaths of others.

One by one, the guests start to die. The first is singer Michel Raven, whose drink is poisoned. During the night, the housekeeper/cook, Elsa Martino, makes a mad dash to escape through the ruins, only to be strangled against a pillar, an ancient Persian method of execution, as noted by Hugh Lombard. A search of the hotel is initiated by General Salve, who splits everyone into pairs. Not long after everyone separates, Salve is stabbed to death in the hotel's catacombs. Their search reveals there is no one in the hotel except the seven of them, and that the killer must be one of them.

The next morning, Elsa's husband, the butler Martino, attempts to escape into the desert and dies of heat exhaustion, his survival kit having been sabotaged. Ilona reveals her tragic past to the others, exposing the cause of her husband's suicide. Later she is found dead, bitten by a venomous snake. The power and lights in the hotel suddenly go out, leaving the five remaining guests in the dark. Judge Cannon convinces them to reveal the nature of the crimes of which they stand accused. Before Vera can offer her explanation, she leaves the others to get her coat. She screams, and the others run to find her. In the confusion, Judge Cannon is found dead in his bedroom, shot in the head.

Because Vera refuses to confess to her guilt, as the other four have, Dr. Armstrong becomes suspicions of Vera and has her locked in her room. Hugh comes to Vera's room during the night and gives her his gun. Vera reveals that she never escaped justice for a murder. Her sister committed the murder, but Vera took the blame, to protect her. Her sister killed herself afterwards. Hugh reveals that he is in fact Charles Morley. The real Hugh Lombard was his best friend, and also committed suicide after the crime of which he was accused. Charles found Hugh's invitation among his belongings while clearing them after his death, and likewise took his friend's place, hoping to learn more about what caused Hugh to take his life.

The next morning, Dr. Armstrong is nowhere to be found. A search of the ruins leads to Blore being pushed off a ledge to his death. Vera and Charles assume Dr. Armstrong is the killer, but are then shocked to find Dr. Armstrong's corpse in the ruins. He has been dead for hours. They realise they are the only two remaining. Vera shoots at Charles.

Vera returns to the hotel, where she finds all the furniture covered in sheets again, except for a chair with a noose above. She finds Judge Cannon very much alive. He reveals that he tricked Dr. Armstrong into helping him fake his "murder". He explains his desire to seek perfect justice and perform his duty as an executioner of the guilty. Judge Cannon tries to convince Vera to hang herself, to avoid spending the rest of her life in jail, since the authorities will assume she is the obvious murderer, as the only remaining guest alive. Judge Cannon drinks poison and prepares to die, only to see Charles appear, alive. Cannon chokes on the poison and realises before he dies that his scheme has been foiled. With Cannon dead, Vera and Charles are picked up by a helicopter as the tape recording is replayed by someone.

Cast 
Charles Aznavour as Michel Raven, entertainer. Accused of having run over two people in Paris while driving under the influence of alcohol.
Stéphane Audran as Ilona Morgan, actress. Accused of having been responsible for the death of her husband "in a most cold-blooded and ruthless manner."
Elke Sommer as Vera Clyde, secretary. Accused of having fatally poisoned her sister's fiancé.
Gert Fröbe as Wilhelm Blore, police official.  Accused of committing perjury to frame an innocent man, who subsequently died in prison.
Herbert Lom as Edward Armstrong, doctor. Accused of having operated on a woman while drunk, causing her death.
Oliver Reed as Hugh Lombard, businessman. Accused of murdering the young woman who was to bear his child out of wedlock. (Revealed as Charles Morley)
Richard Attenborough as Arthur Cannon, judge. Accused of having sentenced an innocent man to death by hanging.
Maria Rohm as Elsa Martino, servant. Accused of helping her husband cause the death of their wealthy, invalid employer.
Alberto de Mendoza as Otto Martino, servant. Accused of causing the death of his wealthy, invalid employer after tricking her into including him and his wife in her will.
Adolfo Celi as André Salvé, military general. Accused of having been responsible for the deaths of five men who were under his command.
Orson Welles as "U.N. Owen" – the Voice on the Tape.
Naser Malek Motiei as Policeman (uncredited)

Production

Writing
The 1974 film reuses the script of the 1965 version, even calling Oliver Reed's character "Hugh" instead of "Phillip," which was the character's name in the novel and play. It is set in an abandoned hotel in the Iranian desert.

Casting
Herbert Lom, who plays Dr. Armstrong in this film, also starred in the 1989 version, as the General (played by Adolfo Celi in this version).

Filming
Much of the film was shot on location in pre-revolution Iran. It is set at a massive, fictional hotel in the desert, adjacent to the ruins of Persepolis.

Interior scenes were filmed at the Shah Abbas Hotel in Isfahan. The nearby Shah Mosque served as the hotel's exterior and main entrance. Wide shots of the hotel, next to the ruins, are effects shots combining photography of the mosque and the ruins. Portions of the film were shot within the ruins of Persepolis, and the famous terrace of the Ālī Qāpū palace, in Isfahan, is made to appear to be part of the ruins. The Bam Citadel was used as a location for Martino's death in the desert. Desert exteriors were filmed in Almería in Andalucía, Spain.

Versions
The European cut of the film featured a pre-credit sequence that showed the guests arriving by plane before boarding a helicopter to be transported to the hotel. However, this prologue was cut from the US release.

Release
The film was an international co-production, with numerous titles worldwide in various languages. It had multiple titles even in English-speaking markets. It was released as And Then There Were None in the UK by EMI Films and in Australia by BEF Films. It was released as Ten Little Indians in the US by Avco Embassy Pictures.

References

External links

And Then There Were None at Variety Distribution

1974 films
1970s crime thriller films
British crime films
British mystery films
French crime films
French mystery films
Italian crime films
Italian mystery films
Spanish crime films
Spanish mystery films
West German films
1970s English-language films
English-language French films
English-language German films
English-language Italian films
English-language Spanish films
Films based on And Then There Were None
Films directed by Peter Collinson
Films scored by Bruno Nicolai
Films shot in Iran
Films set in Isfahan
Films set in hotels
Films set in Iran
Films set in deserts
Films shot in Almería
1970s British films
1970s Italian films
1970s French films